Blackrock Head is a conspicuous coastal rock outcrop on the eastern part of Law Promontory,  northwest of Tryne Point in Antarctica. It was discovered in February 1936 by Discovery Investigations personnel on the William Scoresby and so named by them for its black, rocky appearance.

References 

Rock formations of Kemp Land